The TCW Tag Team Championship was the primary professional wrestling tag team title of Turnbuckle Championship Wrestling. It was originally won by Scott Anton and Erik Watts who defeated Glacier and Jorge Estrada, coincidentally opponents for the TCW Heavyweight Championship, in Dothan, Alabama on March 3, 2001. Unlike the singles titles, the tag team titles changed hands very often when the promotion toured outside the state of Georgia, as far away as Alabama and Tennessee.

Title history

References

Tag team wrestling championships